"Till It's Gone" is a song by American hip hop recording artist Yelawolf, featured on his 2015 album Love Story. Written by Yelawolf, producer WLPWR, guitarist Mike Hartnett and mixing engineer Matthew Hayes, it was originally featured on some versions of the 2014 Shady Records compilation Shady XV. The song was released as the second single from both albums on September 16, 2014.

Recording and production
Like much of Love Story, "Till It's Gone" was recorded at Blackbird Studios in Nashville, Tennessee with mixing engineer Matthew Hayes and producer William "WLPWR" Washington, who also performed keyboards, pads, drums, programming and strings on the song; Mike Hartnett performed guitar and bass guitar. The song originated as an acoustic guitar riff, which was then looped and used as the backing for lyrics which were written "in a couple hours". Due to its "dark and swampy" tone, the track was originally known as "The Swampy Record".

Promotion and release
On September 16, 2014, "Till It's Gone" was featured on the second episode of the seventh season of American crime drama television series Sons of Anarchy, an inclusion which Yelawolf described as a "perfect fit". Speaking about the partnership, Yelawolf has described it as "a big deal" and "one of those moments where the timing was really really good". The single was released on iTunes the same night.

In January 2015, Yelawolf performed an acoustic version of the track for radio network Sirius XM with Travis Barker, Bones Owens and DJ Klever. The live performance was recorded backstage at the Hollywood House of Blues, which Yelawolf describes as the four simply "jamming ... chillin'".

In pop culture
 The song appeared in the trailers for the film Black Mass and video game Call of Duty: Black Ops III.
 The Dan Heath remix appeared on the official soundtrack for WWE 2K16.
 The song was featured in the season 7 of the American crime drama television series Sons of Anarchy.
 The song was sampled by LD Entertainment in the production opening credits for the film Jackie.

Music and lyrics
Speaking about the lyrical themes on display in "Till It's Gone", Yelawolf has described the song as "very aggressive" and "very dark", and notes that "It’s juxtaposed with this melody and the hook that gives it the power". About the music, he has described the beat as "dope, swampy, alligator, snake-infested, gangrene, [and] dark". PopMatters writer Charles Pitter described the song as "melodically acoustic" in his review of Shady XV.

Yelawolf has claimed that the song was "the first song on the album that ... tied the project together and made the perfect sense", noting that its guitar-based style meant it received airplay on alternative rock, country and hip hop radio stations simultaneously. The song has been compared stylistically to Trunk Muzik 0-60 single "Pop the Trunk".

Music video
The music video for "Till It's Gone" was released on October 14, 2014. Yelawolf claimed that the music video, filmed in New Orleans, was "expensive as hell", explaining that "The imagery and the rawness of the record had to match".

Critical reception
Media response to "Till It's Gone" was generally favorable. Reviewing Shady XV for RapReviews.com, Jesal Padania described "Till It's Gone" as "a stunning tour de force from a truly unique artist". In his review of Love Story, Drew Millard of Spin magazine named the track as a highlight of the album, claiming that it "[sounds] like a skiffle song they’d play after somebody died on Nashville" and describing it as evidence that Yelawolf is "one of the best, most imaginative rappers rapping". Chris Mench of Complex magazine also praised "Till It's Gone", noting its "punchy, personal verses over twanging guitars".

Charts

Certifications

Personnel
Credits adapted from Love Story album notes.
WLPWR – keyboards, pads, drums, programming, strings, production
Mike Hartnett – guitar, bass
Matthew Hayes – recording, mixing
Randy Warnken – mixing assistance

References

External links
Music video on YouTube

2014 songs
2014 singles
Yelawolf songs
Shady Records singles
Songs written by Yelawolf